The 1873 Newfoundland general election was held in November 1873 to elect members of the 11th General Assembly of Newfoundland in the Colony of Newfoundland. The Anti-Confederates led by Charles Fox Bennett formed the government; a "new" Conservative party led by Frederick Carter formed the opposition.

Results by party

Elected members
 Twillingate-Fogo
 F.B.T. Carter Conservative
 Charles Duder Anti-Confederate
 Smith McKay Anti-Confederate
 Bonavista Bay
 Charles Bowring Conservative
 A. J. W. McNeily Conservative
 John Burton Conservative
 Trinity Bay
 John Steer Conservative
 John Warren Conservative
 William V. Whiteway Conservative
 Bay de Verde
 James J. Rogerson Conservative
 Carbonear
 John Rorke Conservative
 Harbour Grace
 F.B.T. Carter Conservative
 Ambrose Shea Conservative, elected in 1874
 William Wood Conservative
 Brigus-Port de Grave
 John Bartlett Anti-Confederate
 St. John's East
 J. J. Dearin Anti-Confederate
 Robert John Parsons Anti-Confederate
 Robert J. Kent Anti-Confederate
 St. John's West
 Lewis Tessier Anti-Confederate
 P. J. Scott Anti-Confederate
 Maurice Fenelon Anti-Confederate
 Harbour Main
 Joseph I. Little Anti-Confederate
 Patrick Nowlan Anti-Confederate
 Ferryland
 Thomas Glen Anti-Confederate
 Richard Raftus Anti-Confederate
 Placentia and St. Mary's
 C. F. Bennett Anti-Confederate
 James Collins Anti-Confederate
 Henry Renouf Anti-Confederate
 Burin
 James S. Winter Conservative
 Charles R. Ayre Conservative
 Fortune Bay
 Thomas R. Bennett Anti-Confederate (speaker)
 Burgeo-LaPoile
 Prescott Emerson Conservative

Notes:
Frederick Carter was elected in Twillingate and Fogo and Harbour Grace, choosing to resign from Harbour Grace.

References 
 

1873
1873 elections in North America
1873 elections in Canada
Pre-Confederation Newfoundland
1873 in Newfoundland
November 1873 events